Julius Mordecai Pincas (March 31, 1885 – June 5, 1930), known as Pascin (<ref>"He pronounced his name 'Pass-keen, and so did his friends." (John Ulric Nef, "Reminiscences of Jules Pascin" (June 1966), in Tom L. Freudenheim, Pascin (exhibition catalog), University Art Museum, University of California, Berkeley, 1966)</ref> erroneously  or ), Jules Pascin''', or the "Prince of Montparnasse", was a Bulgarian artist known for his paintings and drawings. He later became an American citizen. His most frequent subject was women, depicted in casual poses, usually nude or partly dressed.

Pascin was educated in Vienna and Munich. He traveled for a time in the United States, spending most of his time in the South. He is best known as a Parisian painter, who associated with the artistic circles of Montparnasse, and was one of the emigres of the School of Paris. Having struggled with depression and alcoholism, he died by suicide at the age of 45.

 Early life 
Julius Mordecai Pincas was born in Vidin, Bulgaria, the eighth of eleven children, to the Sephardic Jewish family of a grain merchant named Marcus Pincas. Originally from Ruse, the Pincas family was one of the wealthiest in Vidin; they bought and exported wheat, rice, maize and sunflower. His mother, Sofie (Sophie) Pincas, belonged to a Sephardic family, Russo, which had moved from Trieste to Zemun, where she and her husband lived before moving to Vidin and where their older children were born.Sephardic marriages in Vienna: February 1901 — Abraham Alfred Yerocham of Plovdiv (son of Menachem and Sol Yerocham) and Rebecca Pincas of Zemun (daughter of Marcus and Sofie Pincas). The family spoke Judaeo-Spanish at home. In 1892, he moved with his parents to Bucharest, where his father opened a grain company, "Marcus Pincas & Co". Pascin worked briefly for his father's firm at the age of fifteen, but also frequented a local brothel where he made his earliest drawings. His first artistic training was in Vienna in 1902 at age seventeen. In 1903 he relocated to Munich, where he studied at Moritz Heymann's academy. In 1905 he began contributing drawings to Simplicissimus, a satirical magazine published in Munich. Because his father objected to the family name being associated with these drawings, the 20-year-old artist adopted the pseudonym Pascin (an anagram of Pincas). He continued to contribute drawings to a Munich daily until 1929.

In December 1905, Pascin moved to Paris becoming part of the great migration of artists to that city at the start of the 20th century. In 1907 he met Hermine Lionette Cartan David, also a painter, and they became lovers. In that same year he had his first solo exhibition at Paul Cassirer Gallery in Berlin. Despite his social life, Pascin created thousands of watercolors and sketches, plus drawings and caricatures that he sold to various newspapers and magazines. He exhibited his works in commercial galleries and in the Salon d'Automne, the Salon des Indépendants, and the exhibitions of the Berlin Secession and at the Sonderbund-Ausstellung in Cologne. Between 1905 and 1914 he exhibited drawings, watercolors, and prints, but rarely paintings. It was not until about 1907–1909 that he produced his first paintings, which were portraits and nudes in a style influenced by Fauvism and Cézanne. He wanted to become a serious painter, but in time he became deeply depressed over his inability to achieve critical success with his efforts. Dissatisfied with his slow progress in the new medium, he studied the art of drawing at the Académie Colarossi, and painted copies after the masters in the Louvre. He exhibited in the United States for the first time in 1913, when twelve of his works were shown at the Armory Show in New York. 
 
Pascin relocated to London at the outbreak of World War I to avoid service in the Bulgarian army and left for the United States on October 3, 1914. On October 31, Hermine David sailed for the United States to join him.

 United States 

Pascin and David lived in the United States from 1914 to 1920, sitting out World War I. They visited New York City, where David had an exhibit. Pascin frequented nightclubs, and met artists such as Yasuo Kuniyoshi and Guy Pène du Bois, but most of his time in America was spent traveling throughout the South. He also visited Cuba. He made many drawings of street life in Charleston, New Orleans, and other places he visited. Some of his works of 1915 and 1916 are in a Cubist style, which he soon abandoned.

In 1918 Pascin married Hermine David at City Hall in New York City. Their witnesses were Max Weber and Maurice Sterne, friends and painters who both lived in New York. In September 1920, Pascin became a naturalized United States citizen, with support from Alfred Stieglitz and Maurice Sterne, but returned to Paris soon afterward. There he began a relationship with Lucy Vidil Krohg, who had been his lover ten years earlier but had married the Norwegian painter Per Krohg during Pascin's years in America.

Especially after he returned to France, he became the symbol of the Montparnasse artistic community and is more associated with France than the United States. Always in his bowler hat, he was a witty presence, along with his good friend Constant Detré, at Le Dôme Café, Jockey-Club de Paris, and the other haunts of the area's bohemian society. Pascin visited Bulgaria in 1923 and 1924 and at an uncertain later date.

 Career 

Like Henri de Toulouse-Lautrec, Pascin drew upon his surroundings and his friends, both male and female, as subjects. During the 1920s, Pascin mostly painted fragile petites filles, prostitutes waiting for clients, or models waiting for the sitting to end. His fleetingly rendered paintings sold readily, but the money he made was quickly spent. Famous as the host of numerous large parties in his flat, whenever he was invited elsewhere for dinner, he arrived with as many bottles of wine as he could carry. He frequently led a large group of friends on summer picnics beside the river Marne, where their excursions lasted all afternoon.

According to his biographer, Georges Charensol:

Scarcely had he chosen his table at the Dôme or the Sélect than he would be surrounded by five or six friends; at nine o'clock, when we got up to dinner, we would be 20 in all, and later in the evening, when we decided to go up to Montmartre to Charlotte Gardelle's or the Princess Marfa's—where Pascin loved to take the place of the drummer in the jazz band—he had to provide for 10 taxis.

Among Pascin's circle of Parisian friends was Ernest Hemingway, whose memoir A Moveable Feast includes a chapter titled "With Pascin At the Dôme", which recounts a night in 1923 when he met Pascin and two of his young models for drinks at the café.

 Death 
Pascin struggled with depression and alcoholism.  "[D]riven to the wall by his own legend", according to art critic Gaston Diehl, he died by suicide at the age of 45 on the eve of a prestigious solo show. He slit his wrists and hanged himself in his studio in Montmartre. He left a message written in blood on the wall to his mistress Lucy Krohg. In his last will and testament, Pascin split his estate equally between his wife, Hermine David, and Lucy Krohg.

On the day of Pascin's funeral, June 7, 1930, thousands of acquaintances from the artistic community, and dozens of waiters and bartenders from the restaurants and saloons Pascin had frequented, all dressed in black, walked behind his coffin for three miles, from his studio at 36 boulevard de Clichy to the Cimetière de Saint-Ouen. A year later, Pascin's family had his remains re-interred at the more prestigious cimetière du Montparnasse.

Honours
Pascin Point in Antarctica is named after Jules Pascin.

 Notes 

 References 
 Alley, Ronald and Margaret Barlow. "Pascin, Jules." Grove Art Online. Oxford Art Online. Oxford University Press. Web.
 Charensol, Georges and Jules Pascin (1928). Jules Pascin. Collection "Les Artistes Juifs". Paris: Éditions "Le Triangle".
 Diehl, Gaston (1968). Pascin. New York: Crown. 
 Dupouy, Alexandre (2014). Pascin. Parkstone Press. 
 
 Werner, Alfred (1972). Pascin: 110 Drawings''. New York: Dover. 
Pascin, Jules at Encyclopædia Britannica

External links 
 
 Information in ArtCyclopedia
 Jules Pascin on artnet

1885 births
1930 suicides
Jewish painters
Bulgarian painters
20th-century French painters
20th-century American male artists
French male painters
20th-century American painters
American male painters
Bulgarian expatriates in Romania
Bulgarian expatriates in Austria
Bulgarian expatriates in Germany
French expatriates in the United States
Bulgarian expatriates in the United States
French people of Bulgarian descent
French Sephardi Jews
Bulgarian Sephardi Jews
Artists who committed suicide
People from Vidin
Painters from Paris
Suicides by hanging in France
Suicides by sharp instrument in France
School of Paris
Jewish American artists
Jewish School of Paris
Académie Colarossi alumni
20th-century American printmakers
Burials at Saint-Ouen Cemetery
Burials at Montparnasse Cemetery